The Way of the Mountains is a 1912 silent short film directed by Romaine Fielding and starring Mary Ryan. It was produced by the Lubin Manufacturing Company and distributed by the General Film Company.

Cast
Robyn Adair - Bob Taylor
Mary Ryan - Mary Beall

References

External links
 The Way of the Mountains at IMDb.com

1912 films
American silent short films
Lubin Manufacturing Company films
Films directed by Romaine Fielding
American black-and-white films
1910s American films